Muscat FC is a Liberian professional football club based in Paynesville. Founded on March 16, 2008, in Du-Port Road, Paynesville, the club competes in the Liberian Second League.

Muscat FC has positively engaged young people in Liberia by committing to support their game and encourage education for all through sports. The club gained promotion to the second division in 2018 after it was undefeated and crowned champions of the third division. The club finished the 2019 season in sixth place, which placed them in the promotion playoff against Nimba Kwado FC.

Club history
Fourth Division

The club played in the fourth division for two seasons from 2005 to 2007. They got promoted to the third division in 2010.

Third Division

Muscat FC played in the third division for three seasons and got promoted to the second division in 2013 for the first time. The team played 19 league matches, winning 16, drawing 2, and losing 1.

Second Division

Muscat FC played in the second division league in 2014 successfully in the first phase, earning the second spot on the league table. During the second phase, Muscat was deducted six points for allegedly "fielding an illegal player" thereby awarding the points to Gardnesville FC. At the end of the league season, Muscat FC was relegated to the third division.

Achievements

Liberian Third Division
Champions (1): 2018Liberian Third Division'''
Runners-up (1): 2013

Squad

Technical staff
Head coach: Jehezakiah Benjamin
Assistant Coach: n/a
Administrative Manager: Abdul Razak
Medic: Ansu Ansumana
Trainer: Abdul Razak
TM : Mccarty Kollie

References

Football clubs in Liberia
Montserrado County